Renovation Rescue is an Australian home renovation television series which screened on the Nine Network in 2004. It was loosely based on the American television series Extreme Makeover: Home Edition, with some differences such as time and the extent of renovation.

Renovation Rescue featured a group of tradespeople renovating a house in just two days. It was hosted by Rebecca Harris, Scott Cam and Peter Everett.

See also
 Backyard Blitz

References

Nine Network original programming
2006 Australian television series debuts
2006 Australian television series endings
Australian non-fiction television series
Home renovation television series